Primary abbey in the context of the Cistercian order refers to the first daughter houses of Cîteaux Abbey.  The four primary abbeys were La Ferté (1113), Pontigny (1114), Clairvaux (1115), and Morimond (1115).

History
The primary abbeys, along with Cîteaux Abbey, were the epicentres of wide-reaching affiliations across Europe.  In the 12th and 13th centuries daughter and granddaughter houses arose, which attached to Cîteaux as their mother house: this system of centralized control of the order was unknown before the Cistercians.  By the death of St. Bernard of Clairvaux in 1153, there were in total 333 dependent houses, by the middle of the 13th century 647, and by 1675 742.  Of these, 109 belonged to Cîteaux, 16 to La Ferté, 43 to Pontigny, 356 to Clairvaux, and 214 to Morimond.

From the later Middle Ages on, the influence of the primary abbeys became ever weaker, as national consciences became stronger.

References

Further reading 
 Immo Eberl: Die Zisterzienser. Geschichte eines europäischen Ordens. Lizenzausgabe. Wissenschaftliche Buchgesellschaft, Darmstadt 2002, S. 38ff, 47ff, 81f. (Unveränderter Nachdruck: Thorbecke, Ostfildern 2007).
 Kaspar Elm, Peter Feige: Reformen und Kongregationsbildungen der Zisterzienser im Spätmittelalter und früher Neuzeit. In: Die Zisterzienser. Ordensleben zwischen Ideal und Wirklichkeit. Bonn 1980, S. 243–254.

Cistercian Order
Cistercian monasteries in France